Mount Pleasant, Indiana may refer to:

Mount Pleasant, Cass County, Indiana
Mount Pleasant, Delaware County, Indiana
Mount Pleasant, Martin County, Indiana
Mount Pleasant, Johnson County, Indiana
Mount Pleasant, Perry County, Indiana